Eduardo Kempf Schwade (born 28 September 2002), commonly known as Dudu, is a Brazilian footballer who plays as a left back for Juventude.

Club career
Born in Feliz, Rio Grande do Sul, Dudu joined Juventude's youth setup in 2011, aged nine. On 12 July 2021, he renewed his contract with the club until the end of 2023.

Dudu made his first team debut on 26 January 2022, coming on as a late substitute for Capixaba in a 2–1 Campeonato Gaúcho home loss against Internacional. On 5 April, after featuring rarely, he was loaned to Série B side Londrina until the end of the year.

After only 56 minutes of action in five matches, Dudu's loan was cut short in July 2022, and he returned to Juventude. He made his Série A debut on 9 November, starting in a 2–2 home draw against Flamengo.

Career statistics

References

2002 births
Living people
Sportspeople from Rio Grande do Sul
Brazilian footballers
Association football defenders
Campeonato Brasileiro Série A players
Campeonato Brasileiro Série B players
Esporte Clube Juventude players
Londrina Esporte Clube players